Tim Pettorini is a college baseball Head Coach who coaches College of Wooster. He is currently in his 32nd year coaching the team.

Coaching career
Pettorini has coached Wooster to many winning seasons including a winning percentage of 80 percent over the past 17 years (613-180-1; .783). The Wooster Fighting Scots went on to win the league-leading 14th NCAC championship (1985, 1987, 1988, 1990, 1991, 1995, 1998, 2002, 2004, 2005, 2006, 2009, 2010, 2012).

See also
List of college baseball coaches with 1,100 wins

References

Living people
High school baseball coaches in the United States
Wooster Fighting Scots baseball coaches
Wooster Fighting Scots baseball players
College baseball announcers in the United States
Year of birth missing (living people)